The Viau Bridge (officially in ; formerly called the Ahuntsic Bridge) was built in 1930, rebuilt in 1962 and widened in 1993.

The bridge spans the Rivière des Prairies between the Montreal borough of Ahuntsic-Cartierville and the Laval neighbourhood of Pont Viau. It is part of Route 335. About 36,000 drivers cross the bridge each weekday.  The Société de transport de Laval has a designated bus lane for one of its bus routes heading south towards Henri-Bourassa Terminus Nord and the Henri Bourassa Station and north towards Cartier Station.  The Orange Line (Line 2) of the Montreal Metro that was extended in 2007 northward to Laval is backed up with the bus route of the same number.  On August 8, 2007, a large hole and crack in the bus-only lane near the Laurentian Boulevard (Laval) side of the bridge brought a complete closure, but an inspection concluded that the bridge had no structural problems or damage and was reopened the same day.

A wooden bridge was built there in 1847.

See also
List of bridges in Canada
List of bridges spanning the Rivière des Prairies
List of bridges in Montreal
List of crossings of the Rivière des Prairies

References 

Ahuntsic-Cartierville
Bridges in Montreal
Bridges completed in 1962
Bridges in Laval, Quebec
Open-spandrel deck arch bridges in Canada
Rivière des Prairies
Road bridges in Quebec